Atomic Age in design refers to the period roughly corresponding to 1940–1963, when concerns about nuclear war dominated Western society during the Cold War. Architecture, industrial design, commercial design (including advertising), interior design, and fine arts were all influenced by the themes of atomic science, as well as the Space Age, which coincided with that period. Atomic Age design became popular and instantly recognizable, with a use of atomic motifs and space age symbols.

Vital forms
Abstract organic forms were identified as a core motif in the 2001 exhibition of Atomic Age design at the Brooklyn Museum of Art, titled "Vital forms: American art and design in the atomic age, 1940–1960". Atomic power was a paradox during the era. It held great promise of technological solutions for the problems facing an increasingly complex world; at the same time, people were fearful of a nuclear armageddon, after the use of atomic weapons at the end of World War II. People were ever-aware of the potential good, and lurking menace, in technology. Science became more visible in the mainstream culture through Atomic Age design.

Atomic particles themselves were reproduced in visual design, in areas ranging from architecture to barkcloth patterns. The geometric atomic patterns that were produced in textiles, industrial materials, melamine counter tops, dishware and wallpaper, and many other items, are emblematic of Atomic Age design. The Space Age interests of the public also began showing up in Atomic Age designs, with star and galaxy motifs appearing with the atomic graphics.

Free-form biomorphic shapes also appear as a recurring theme in Atomic Age design. British designers at the Council of Industrial Design (CoID) produced fabrics in the early 1950s that showed "skeletal plant forms, drawn in a delicate, spidery graphic form", reflecting x-ray technology that was becoming more widespread and familiar in pop culture. These botanic designs influenced later Atomic Age patterns that included repeating organic shapes similar to cells and organisms viewed through a microscope.

There are similarities between many Atomic Age designs and the mid-century modern trend of the same time. Elements of Atomic Age and Space Age design were dominant in the Googie design movement in commercial buildings in the United States. Some streamlined industrial designs also echoed the influence of futurism that had been seen much earlier in Art Deco design.

Space Age design
Whereas Atomic Age motifs and structures leaned towards design fields such as architecture and industrial design, Space Age design spread into a broader range of consumer products, including furniture, clothing fashion, and even animation styles, as with the popular television show The Jetsons. Beginning with the dawn of the Space Age (commonly attributed to the launch of Sputnik in October 1957), Space Age design captured the optimism and faith in technology that was felt by much of society during the 1950s and 1960s, together with the design possibilities afforded by newly accessible materials like fibreglass that had become much more widely available since the second world war. Space Age design also had a more vernacular character, appearing in accessible forms that quickly became familiar to mainstream consumers. Since the end of the 1970s, Space Age design has become more closely associated with kitsch and with Googie architecture for popular commercial buildings such as diners, bowling alleys, and shops, though the finest examples of its kind have remained desirable and highly collectible. "Space Age design is closely tied to the pop movement [...] the fusion of popular culture, art, design, and fashion".

Fashion

Two of the most well-known fashion designers to use Space Age themes in their designs were Pierre Cardin and Paco Rabanne. Pierre Cardin established the futuristic trend of using synthetic and industrial materials in fashion, with "forward thinking" innovations in his early 1960s work. Cardin "popularized the use of everyday materials for fashion items, like vinyl and metal rings for dresses, carpentry nails for brooches, and common decorative effects such as geometric cut-outs, appliqués, large pockets, helmets and oversized buttons". In 1964, Cardin launched his "space age" line, and André Courrèges showed his "Moon Girl" collection, introducing the white go-go boot style and other icons of the 1960s. The Japanese designer, Issey Miyake from Hiroshima, worked in Paris and New York from 1964 to 1970, and used many atomic age forms, and technologically produced materials in his work. In 1970 he moved to Tokyo to continue these innovations. Miyake cites his first encounter with design as being two bridges in his hometown, Hiroshima, at the hypocenter of the atomic bombing in WWII.

Vernacular architecture

The dingbat apartment house, ubiquitous in the Los Angeles, California area, was built between 1945 through the 1960s, and fused a purist style with googie influence. The architect, Francis Ventre, coined the term "Dingbat (building)" for these quickly built stucco and frame simple structures. These structures often had a single exterior ornament in the shape of a starburst, boomerang, or pattern of rectangles.

Architecture

The Chemosphere house, designed by John Lautner in 1960, has become an icon of the atomic age home. The octagonal shaped house is cantilevered on a steep slope in the Hollywood Hills, California. At the time, Encyclopædia Britannica cited it as the "most modern home built in the world."

Designers
Some of the leading designers who employed the Atomic Age style in their works include:
 Charles Eames
 Ray Eames
 Pierre Koenig
 Virgil Exner
 Richard Neutra
 Eero Saarinen
 Frank Lloyd Wright
 Eero Aarnio

See also
 Atomic Age
 Futurism
 Googie architecture
 List of Googie architecture structures (United States)
 Mid-century modern
 Modernism

References

1940s introductions
Modernism
Design
Popular culture
American popular culture
Space Age